was a town located in Nishikasugai District, Aichi Prefecture, Japan.

As of 2003, the town had an estimated population of 33,752 and a density of 3,381.96 persons per km². The total area was 9.98 km².

On March 20, 2006, Nishiharu, along with the town of Shikatsu (also Nishikasugai District), was merged to create the city of Kitanagoya.

External links
 Kitanagoya official website 

Dissolved municipalities of Aichi Prefecture
Kitanagoya, Aichi